Luminaria and similar terms may refer to:

Holiday illuminations
Luminaria, also known as a farolito, a paper lantern
Luminaria (vigil fire), traditional bonfires in New Mexico
Luminarias festival, ritual bonfires in San Bartolomé de Pinares

Music and film
Luminaria (album) by Ian Moore
Luminarias (film) written by Evelina Fernandez

Places
Luminárias, a municipality in Minas Gerais, Brazil

Other
Disney's LuminAria, a fireworks show held from 2001 to 2002 at Disney's California Adventure
Luminaria Contemporary Arts Festival, held annually in downtown San Antonio, Texas, since 2008

See also
Luminary (disambiguation)